Junipers are coniferous trees and shrubs in the genus Juniperus of the cypress family Cupressaceae. Depending on the taxonomy, between 50 and 67 species of junipers are widely distributed throughout the Northern Hemisphere, from the Arctic, south to tropical Africa, throughout parts of western, central and southern Asia, east to eastern Tibet in the Old World, and in the mountains of Central America.

Description

They are evergreen with needle-like and/or scale-like leaves. They can be either monoecious or dioecious. In some species, these "berries" are red-brown or orange, but in most, they are blue; they are often aromatic and can be used as a spice. The seed maturation time varies between species from 6 to 18 months after pollination. The male cones are similar to the other Cupressaceae, with 6 to 20 scales.

In hardiness zones 7 through 10, junipers can bloom and release pollen several times each year. Different junipers bloom in autumn, while most pollinate from early winter until late spring.

Many junipers (e.g. When juvenile foliage occurs on mature plants, it is most often found on shaded shoots, with adult foliage in full sunlight. Leaves on fast-growing 'whip' shoots are often intermediate between juvenile and adult.

In some species (e.g. J. communis, J. squamata), all the foliage is of the juvenile needle-like type, with no scale leaves. In some of these (e.g. J. communis), the needles are jointed at the base, while in others (e.g. J. squamata), the needles merge smoothly with the stem.
The needle leaves of junipers are hard and sharp, making the juvenile foliage very prickly to handle. This can be a valuable identification feature in seedlings, as the otherwise very similar juvenile foliage of cypresses (Cupressus, Chamaecyparis) and other related genera are soft and not prickly.

Junipers are gymnosperms, which means they have seeds, but no flowers or fruits. Depending on the species, the seeds they produce take 1–3 years to develop. The impermeable coat of the seed keeps water from getting in and protects the embryo when dispersed. It can also result in a long dormancy that is usually broken by physically damaging the seed coat. Dispersal can occur from being swallowed whole by frugivores and mammals. The resistance of the seed coat allows it to be passed down through the digestive system without being destroyed along the way. These seeds last a long time, as they can be dispersed long distances over the course of a few years.

Classification

Sections
The genus has been divided into sections in somewhat different ways. A system based on molecular phylogenetic data from 2013 and earlier used three sections:
 Section Caryocedrus – 1 species with large, blue, woody, 3-seeded cones; native to the Mediterranean
 Section Juniperus –  14 species with blue or red seed cones, often with 3 seeds; 12 species native to the eastern hemisphere, one endemic to North America, and one species, J. communis, circumboreal
 Section Sabina – about 60 species with variously coloured seed cones with 1 to 13 seeds; species about equally divided between the eastern and western hemispheres Juniperus sect. Sabina was further divided into clades.

A new classification of gymnosperms published in 2022 recognised the sections as three separate genera:  Arceuthos for section Caryocedrus, Sabina for section Sabina, and Juniperus sensu stricto for section Juniperus.

Species

Juniperus sect. Caryocedrus 
One species:
Juniperus drupacea – Syrian juniper

Juniperus sect. Juniperus 
Needle-leaf junipers; the adult leaves are needle-like, in whorls of three, and jointed at the base. Species:
Juniperus sect. Juniperus subsect. Juniperus – cones with 3 separate seeds; needles with one stomatal band
Juniperus communis – common juniper
Juniperus communis subsp. alpina – alpine juniper
Juniperus conferta, syn. Juniperus rigida var. conferta (Parl.) Patschke – shore juniper
Juniperus rigida – Temple juniper or needle juniper
Juniperus sect. Juniperus subsect. Oxycedrus – cones with 3 separate seeds; needles with two stomatal bands
Juniperus brevifolia – Azores juniper
Juniperus cedrus – Canary Islands juniper
Juniperus formosana – Chinese prickly juniper
Juniperus lutchuensis, syn. Juniperus taxifolia var. lutchuensis (Koidz.) Satake – Ryukyu juniper
Juniperus oxycedrus – Western prickly juniper, cade juniper
Juniperus macrocarpa – large-berry juniper
Juniperus sect. Juniperus subsect. Caryocedrus – cones with 3 seeds fused together; needles with two stomatal bands

Juniperus sect. Sabina 
Scale-leaf junipers; adult leaves are mostly scale-like, similar to those of Cupressus species, in opposite pairs or whorls of three, and the juvenile needle-like leaves are not jointed at the base (including in the few that have only needle-like leaves; see below right).

Old World species 

Juniperus chinensis – Chinese juniper
Juniperus convallium – Mekong juniper
Juniperus excelsa – Greek juniper
Juniperus foetidissima – stinking juniper
Juniperus indica – Himalayan black juniper
Juniperus komarovii – Komarov's juniper
Juniperus phoenicea – Phoenicean juniper
Juniperus pingii – Ping juniper
Juniperus procera – East African juniper
Juniperus procumbens – Ibuki juniper
Juniperus pseudosabina – Xinjiang juniper
Juniperus recurva – Himalayan juniper
Juniperus sabina – Savin juniper
Juniperus saltuaria – Sichuan juniper
Juniperus semiglobosa – Himalayan pencil juniper
Juniperus seravschanica – Pashtun juniper
Juniperus squamata – flaky juniper
Juniperus thurifera – Spanish juniper
Juniperus tibetica – Tibetan juniper

New World species 

Juniperus angosturana – Mexican one-seed juniper
Juniperus ashei – Ashe juniper
Juniperus arizonica – redberry juniper, roseberry juniper
Juniperus barbadensis – West Indies juniper
Juniperus bermudiana – Bermuda juniper
Juniperus blancoi – Blanco's juniper
Juniperus californica – California juniper
Juniperus coahuilensis – Coahuila juniper
Juniperus comitana – Comitán juniper
Juniperus deppeana – alligator juniper
Juniperus durangensis – Durango juniper
Juniperus flaccida – Mexican weeping juniper
Juniperus gamboana – Gamboa juniper
Juniperus grandis – Sierra juniper
Juniperus horizontalis – creeping juniper
Juniperus jaliscana – Jalisco juniper
Juniperus maritima, syn. Juniperus scopulorum – seaside juniper
Juniperus monosperma – one-seed juniper
Juniperus monticola – mountain juniper
Juniperus occidentalis – western juniper
Juniperus osteosperma – Utah juniper
Juniperus pinchotii – Pinchot juniper
Juniperus saltillensis – Saltillo juniper
Juniperus scopulorum – Rocky Mountain juniper
Juniperus standleyi – Standley's juniper
Juniperus virginiana – eastern juniper, eastern redcedar
Juniperus virginiana subsp. silicicola – Southern juniper
Juniperus zanonii (proposed)

Additional species
, Plants of the World Online accepts the following additional species to those listed above:
Juniperus canariensis Guyot & Mathou
Juniperus coxii A.B.Jacks.
Juniperus deltoides R.P.Adams
Juniperus gracilior Pilg.
Juniperus mairei Lemée & H.Lév.
Juniperus morrisonicola Hayata
Juniperus mucronata R.P.Adams
Juniperus navicularis Gand.
Juniperus poblana (Martínez) R.P.Adams
Juniperus polycarpos K.Koch
Juniperus przewalskii Kom.
Juniperus saxicola Britton & P.Wilson
Juniperus taxifolia Hook. & Arn.
Juniperus tsukusiensis Masam.
Juniperus turbinata Guss.

Ecology
Juniper plants thrive in a variety of environments. The junipers from Lahaul valley can be found in dry, rocky locations planted in stony soils. Grazing animals and the villagers are rapidly using up these plants. There are several important features of the leaves and wood of this plant that cause villagers to cut down these trees and make use of them. Additionally, the western juniper plants, a particular species in the juniper genus, are found in woodlands where there are large, open spaces. Junipers are known to encompass open areas so that they have more exposure to rainfall. Decreases in fires and a lack of livestock grazing are the two major causes of western juniper takeover. This invasion of junipers is driving changes in the environment. For instance, the ecosystem for other species previously living in the environment and farm animals has been compromised. When junipers increase in population, there is a decrease in woody species like mountain big sagebrush and aspen. Among the juniper trees themselves, there is increased competition, which results in a decrease in berry production. Herbaceous cover decreases, and junipers are often mistaken for weeds. As a result, several farmers have thinned the juniper trees or removed them completely. However, this reduction did not result in any significant difference on wildlife survival. Some small mammals found it advantageous to have thinner juniper trees, while cutting down the entire tree was not favorable.

Some junipers are susceptible to Gymnosporangium rust disease and can be a serious problem for those people growing apple trees, an alternate host of the disease.

Juniper is the exclusive food plant of the larvae of some moths and butterflies, including Bucculatrix inusitata, juniper carpet, Chionodes electella, Chionodes viduella, juniper pug, and pine beauty. Those of the tortrix moth Cydia duplicana feed on the bark around injuries or canker.

Cultivation

Junipers are among the most popular conifers to be cultivated as ornamental subjects for parks and gardens. They have been bred over many years to produce a wide range of forms, in terms of colour, shape and size. They include some of the dwarfest (miniature) cultivars. They are also used for bonsai. Some species found in cultivation include:

Juniperus chinensis
Juniperus communis
Juniperus horizontalis
Juniperus × pfitzeriana
Juniperus procumbens
Juniperus rigida
Juniperus scopulorum
Juniperus squamata

Toxicity 
In drier areas, juniper pollen easily becomes airborne and can be inhaled into the lungs. This pollen can also irritate the skin and cause contact dermatitis. Cross-allergenic reactions are common between juniper pollen and the pollen of all species of cypress.

Monoecious juniper plants are highly allergenic, with an Ogren Plant Allergy Scale (OPALS) rating of 9 out of 10. Completely male juniper plants have an OPALS rating of 10, and release abundant amounts of pollen. Conversely, all-female juniper plants have an OPALS rating of 1, and are considered "allergy-fighting".

Uses

Ethnic and herbal use
Most species of juniper are flexible and have a high compression strength-to-weight ratio. This has made the wood a traditional choice for the construction of hunting bows among some of the Native American cultures in the Great Basin region. These bow staves are typically backed with sinew to provide tension strength that the wood may lack.

Ancient Mesopotamians believed that juniper oil could be used to ward off the evil eye.

Embalming vessels in the burial chambers from a 26th Dynasty embalming workshop at Saqqara have shown the usage of Juniper oil/tar.

Some Indigenous peoples of the Americas use juniper in traditional medicine; for instance the Dineh (Navajo), who use it for diabetes. Juniper ash has also been historically consumed as a source of calcium by the Navajo people.

Juniper is traditionally used in Scottish folkloric and Gaelic Polytheist saining rites, such as those performed at Hogmanay (New Year), where the smoke of burning juniper, accompanied by traditional prayers and other customary rites, is used to cleanse, bless, and protect the household and its inhabitants.

Local people in Lahaul Valley present juniper leaves to their deities as a folk tradition. It is also useful as a folk remedy for pains and aches, as well as epilepsy and asthma. They are reported to collect large amounts of juniper leaves and wood for building and religious purposes.

General use

Juniper berries are a spice used in a wide variety of culinary dishes and are best known for the primary flavoring in gin (and responsible for gin's name, which is a shortening of the Dutch word for juniper, jenever). A juniper-based spirit is made by fermenting juniper berries and water to create a "wine" that is then distilled. This is often sold as a juniper brandy in eastern Europe.  Juniper berries are also used as the primary flavor in the liquor Jenever and sahti-styles of beers.  Juniper berry sauce is often a popular flavoring choice for quail, pheasant, veal, rabbit, venison, and other game dishes.

A tea can be made from the young twigs.

Dense and rot resistant, the irregular trunks of junipers have been used as fence posts and firewood. Stands that produce enough wood for specialty uses generally go under the common name "cedar," including Juniperus virginiana, the "red cedar" that is used widely in cedar drawers and closets. The lack of space or a hyphen between the words "red" and "cedar" is sometimes used to indicate that this species is not a true cedar (Cedrus).

Juniper in weave is a traditional cladding technique used in Northern Europe, e.g. at Havrå, Norway.

Juniper berries are steam distilled to produce an essential oil that may vary from colorless to yellow or pale green. Some of its chemical components are terpenoids and aromatic compounds, such as cadinene, a sesquiterpene.

References

Further reading
Adams, R. P. (2004). Junipers of the World: The genus Juniperus. Victoria: Trafford. 
Farjon, A. (2001). World Checklist and Bibliography of Conifers. Kew. 
Farjon, A. (2005). Monograph of Cupressaceae and Sciadopitys. Royal Botanic Gardens, Kew.

External links
 
 Junipers of the world
 Gymnosperm Database – Juniperus
 Arboretum de Villardebelle Photos of cones and foliage of selected species
 
 

Juniperus